The 2006 Trophée Éric Bompard was the fourth event of six in the 2006–07 ISU Grand Prix of Figure Skating, a senior-level international invitational competition series. It was held at the Palais Omnisports Paris Bercy in Paris on November 17–19. Medals were awarded in the disciplines of men's singles, ladies' singles, pair skating, and ice dancing. Skaters earned points toward qualifying for the 2006–07 Grand Prix Final.

The competition was named after the Éric Bompard company, which became its chief sponsor in 2004.

Results

Men

Ladies

Pairs

Ice dancing

External links
 2006 Trophée Éric Bompard

Trophée Éric Bompard, 2006
Internationaux de France
Figure
Figure skating in Paris
International figure skating competitions hosted by France